Gabriele Bruni (born 2 May 1974) is an Italian sailor. He competed in the 49er event at the 2000 Summer Olympics.

References

External links
 

1974 births
Living people
Italian male sailors (sport)
Olympic sailors of Italy
Sailors at the 2000 Summer Olympics – 49er
Sportspeople from Palermo